The 53rd Rolex 24 at Daytona was an endurance sports car racing event held at the Daytona International Speedway, Daytona Beach, Florida from 22–25 January 2015.  The 53rd running of the 24 Hours of Daytona was also the first race for the 2015 United SportsCar Championship season.

Results

Race

Footnotes

References

 Provisional Race results

24 Hours of Daytona
Daytona
Daytona
Daytona